December is an upcoming Russian period detective thriller film written and directed by Klim Shipenko about the last days of the life of the poet Sergei Yesenin, performed by Alexander Petrov, as well as Sergey Gilyov, Kristina Asmus, Andrey Merzlikin, Vladimir Vdovichenkov, Aleksandr Samoylenko, and Kirill Nagiyev in their debut cinematic roles.

It is scheduled to be theatrically released in 2023 by Central Partnership.

Plot 
Sergei Yesenin, with the help of Isadora Duncan, plans an escape from the Soviet Union and finds himself on incredible adventures.

Cast 
 Alexander Petrov as Sergei Yesenin
 Sergey Gilyov
 Kristina Asmus as Yelizaveta Ustinova
 Andrey Merzlikin
 Vladimir Vdovichenkov
 Aleksandr Samoylenko
 Kirill Nagiyev
 Mariya Veleshnaya as Isadora Duncan
 Sofya Karpunina

Production 
Klim Shipenko wrote the screenplay together with his father, the famous playwright Aleksey Shipenko.

The development of the detective will be done by the Yellow, Black and White studio, which previously collaborated with the cinematographer during the creation of his previous film, Serf (2019).

Filming
Principal photography began in December 2020 in Moscow and Saint Petersburg. For the film, large-scale scenery of more than 7 thousand square meters has already been built.

Release
December was theatrically released in the Russian Federation was in cinemas across the country from 2023, by Central Partnership.

References

External links 
 Official website 
 

2020s Russian-language films
Russian historical drama films
Russian crime thriller films
Russian thriller drama films
Films based on crime novels
Films shot in Moscow
Films shot in Saint Petersburg
2023 films
Films directed by Klim Shipenko
2020s crime thriller films
Russian detective films
Upcoming Russian-language films